"Host" is a song by British indie rock band The Crocketts. Credited to Davey MacManus and The Crocketts and produced by Charlie Francis, "Host" was featured on the band's 2000 second album The Great Brain Robbery, and released as its first single on 3 April 2000.

Composition
Writer and vocalist Davey MacManus has provided the following explanation of the song's meaning:

Reception
In their review of The Great Brain Robbery, magazine Welsh Bands Weekly described "Host" as an "addictive" song, claiming that it "sticks around inside your head for days ... and the pretty guitar sound is just so addictive". Kerrang! awarded the single four out of five Ks in their review, describing the song as "a slightly melancholy number ... a timely reminder that life can be amazing, even when it hurts".

Music video
The music video for "Host" was directed by Ralph Brown and produced by Mark Williams, both of whom also perform in the video. The video was filmed in Brighton on the request of Williams, including a number of "rich and red" theatre interiors on the West Pier. Williams describes the theme of the video as "a ghost story", and says that the inspiration came from listening to the lyrics of the song.

Track listing

Personnel
The Crocketts
Davey MacManus ("Davey Crockett") – vocals, guitar; production and mixing on "You Don't Know Nothing" and "Beast with Two Backs"
Dan Harris ("Dan Boone") – guitar; production and mixing on "You Don't Know Nothing" and "Beast with Two Backs"
Richard Carter ("Rich Wurzel") – bass; production and mixing on "You Don't Know Nothing" and "Beast with Two Backs"
Owen Hopkin ("Owen Cash") – drums; production and mixing on "You Don't Know Nothing" and "Beast with Two Backs"
Additional personnel
Charlie Francis – production and mixing on "Host", "Host" (live), "Will You Still Care" (live) and "Strong Guy" (live)
Dave Murder – production and mixing on "You Don't Know Nothing" and "Beast with Two Backs"

References

2000 singles
The Crocketts songs
2000 songs